The Ministry of the Presidency is a ministry of the Republic of Costa Rica created on 24 December 1961 through Law 2980. Its work prescribed by law consists in providing support to the President of the Republic, serving as a liaison between the Presidency and the other branches of government, civil society and the various ministries.

Being one of the most political ministries, since it has to coordinate with the social and political organizations, with the Legislative Assembly and with the opposition groups, it is usually put in charge of one of the closest collaborators of the President. The Costa Rican intelligence agency, the Directorate of Intelligence and Security, reports to the Ministry of the Presidency, which has generated controversy.

Said portfolio is one of the most important in the Costa Rican presidential cabinet. The Minister of the Presidency has among its functions to coordinate inter-ministerial and inter-institutional work, to be an interlocutor between the President and the Parliament together with other tasks similar to those that in other countries fall on a Chief of Cabinet or Prime Minister, so usually a person of extreme confidence of the President is appointed. It is not unusual, too, that a few former presidential ministers have been later elected presidents of the Republic. The Minister of the Presidency, however, is not head of government, as Costa Rica's Constitution establishes that the President is both head of state and head of government.

The headquarters of the Ministry of the Presidency are located in Casa Presidencial in Zapote District, San José.

List of Ministers

References

Political office-holders in Costa Rica
Government of Costa Rica